Guilford Lake is a lake in Columbiana County, Ohio, in the United States.

History 
Guilford Lake was constructed as a canal feed and reservoir for the Sandy and Beaver Canal in 1834. Guilford Lake was named for Edward H. Gill, a canal engineer responsible for the lake's creation.

Recreation 
The lake is incorporated within Guilford Lake State Park, which was established in 1949. The park includes a small campground to the north side of the lake, a small beach and a playground. Facilities with paddle and pontoon boat rentals are available along with a public boat launch ramp on the shore. The park is home to many species of wildlife and attracts migrating birds. It is also surrounded by many homes, with both seasonal and permanent residents.

See also
List of lakes in Ohio

References

Lakes of Ohio
Bodies of water of Columbiana County, Ohio